The WAUA is the West African Unit of Account currency. This is the currency of the subregion of the West African.

Exchange rates

References 

Currencies of Africa
Economic Community of West African States